James Grieve (14 February 1906 – 1946) was an English professional footballer who scored 13 goals from 29 appearances in the Football League playing as a centre forward for Darlington in the 1930s. He joined Darlington from non-league club Wallsend, and went on to play non-league football for Annfield Plain.

Life and career
Grieve was born in 1906 in Walkergate, Northumberland. He played football for North-Eastern League club Wallsend before joining Darlington of the Football League Third Division North in 1931. He played for Darlington's reserve team in the North-Eastern League before making his Football League debut on 24 October 1931 away to Carlisle United, standing in for the injured Maurice Wellock. Darlington won 2–0, Grieve scored both goals, and he caught the eye of the Lancashire Evening Post by his "pushfulness and sense of leadership". Wellock resumed his place after two matches out, but when Grieve was brought in for an FA Cup tie against Carlisle in December, this time alongside Wellock, who moved to inside right to accommodate Grieve at centre forward, he scored again, and scored another in the next league match.

In the second half of the season Grieve took over as first choice at centre forward, and contributed a further ten goals from 20 matches, including a hat-trick in a 6–3 win against local rivals Hartlepools United in which "Wellock, Grieve, and Coates shot at every conceivable opportunity, on the half turn, the volley, the half-volley, and on occasions when their backs were turned to the goal". Darlington finished 11th in the table. He accepted terms for a second season, but an attempt to convert him to outside left was unsuccessful: he played little and without scoring, and was given a free transfer.

He then returned to North-Eastern League football with Annfield Plain, where he flourished. In November 1934, he turned down an offer from the FA Cup-holders, Manchester City, preferring to keep his job in Newcastle with the London and North Eastern Railway, and he stayed with Annfield Plain until at least 1937. The 1939 Register shows Grieve working as a general cartman and living in Raby Street, Newcastle, with his wife Edna and five young children. He died in Newcastle in 1946 at the age of 40.

References
General
 
Specific

1906 births
1946 deaths
Footballers from Newcastle upon Tyne
English footballers
Association football forwards
Wallsend F.C. players
Darlington F.C. players
Annfield Plain F.C. players
English Football League players
Date of death missing